The Atom Clock is a  science fiction play by Cornel Lengyel. It was published in 1951 by Fantasy Publishing Company, Inc. in an edition of 1,000 copies of which 250 were hardcover. The play received the Maxwell Anderson Award in 1950.

Plot introduction
The play concerns a worker who rebels against military control of atomic energy.

References

1950 plays
1951 books
American plays
Fantasy Publishing Company, Inc. books